KSUM (1370 AM) is a radio station licensed to Fairmont, Minnesota.  The station broadcasts a country music format and is owned by City of Lakes Media.

On August 21, 2020, the station also began broadcasting on 97.1 MHz from its translator, K246CW, located at the same site as the AM facility and its sister station, KFMC.

References

External links
KSUM's website

Country radio stations in the United States
Radio stations in Minnesota